Zhang Tianyi (born 24 April 1990) is a Chinese swimmer who competed in the 2004 Summer Olympics in the 400 m individual medley.

References

1990 births
Living people
Swimmers from Liaoning
Chinese female medley swimmers
Olympic swimmers of China
Swimmers at the 2004 Summer Olympics
Sportspeople from Dandong
21st-century Chinese women